Bagh-e Tir-e Hajjiabad (also Romanized as Bāgh-e Tīr-e Ḩājjīābād; also known as Bāgh-e Tīr and Bāgh Tīr) is a village in Khobriz Rural District, in the Central District of Arsanjan County, Fars Province, Iran. At the 2006 census, its population was 81, in 21 families.

References 

Populated places in Arsanjan County